As a first name, Minnie is a feminine given name. It can be a diminutive (hypocorism) of Minerva, Winifred, Wilhelmina, Hermione, Mary, Miriam, Maria, Marie, Naomi, Miranda, Clementine or Amelia. It may refer to:

People with the given name
 Minnie Tittell Brune (1875–1974), American stage actress
 Minnie Campbell (1862–1952), Canadian clubwoman, lecturer, and editor
 Minnie D. Craig (1883–1966), American legislator and the first female speaker of a state House of Representatives (North Dakota) in the United States
 Minnie Fisher Cunningham (1882–1964), suffrage politician and first executive secretary of the League of Women Voters
 Minnie Devereaux (1891–1984), Canadian Cheyenne silent film actress
 Minnie Dupree (1873–1947), American stage and film actress
 Minnie Egener (1881–1938), American operatic mezzo-soprano
 Minnie Evans (1892–1987), African-American folk artist
 Minnie Maddern Fiske (1865–1932), leading American actress
 Minnie Rutherford Fuller (1868-1946), American farmer, broker, temperance leader, suffragist
 Minnie Gentry (1915–1993), American actress
Minnie Goodnow (1871 – 1952), American nurse and nursing educator
 Minnie Lansbury (1889–1922), English suffragette
 Minnie Marx (1865–1929), mother and manager of the Marx Brothers, born Miene Schönberg
 Minnie Mumford, better known as Jerri Mumford (1909–2002), Canadian military servicewoman during World War II
 Minnie Nast (1874–1956), German soprano
 Minnie Ward Patterson, American poet and author
 Minnie Pwerle (between 1910 and 1922–2006), Australian Aboriginal painter
 Minnie Rayner (1869–1941), British film actress
 Minnie Riperton (1947–1979), singer and song writer
 Minnie Soo (born 1998), Hong Kong table tennis player

People with the nickname

Women
 Maria Feodorovna (Dagmar of Denmark) (1847–1928), Empress of Russia, known within her family as Minnie
 Minnie Dean (1844–1895), only woman to receive the death penalty in New Zealand
 Minnie Driver (born 1970), English actress and singer-songwriter
 Minnie Hauk (1851–1929), American operatic soprano
 Minnie Pearl (1912-1996), stage name for American comedienne, Sarah Ophelia Colley Cannon
 Minnie Vautrin (1886–1941), American missionary who saved the lives of many women during the Nanking Massacre
 Minnie Warren (1849–1878), American dwarf associated with P. T. Barnum
 Memphis Minnie (1897-1973), American blues singer
 Minnie (1997), Thailand-born K-pop singer of (G)I-dle, Nicha Yontararak

Men
 Roy McGiffin (1891–1918), ice hockey player
 Minnie Mendoza (born 1933), Cuban retired Major League Baseball player and coach
 Minnie Miñoso (born 1925), Cuban retired Major League Baseball and Negro leagues player
 Minnie Rojas (1933–2002), Major League Baseball relief pitcher

Fictional characters
 Minnie Mouse, an animated character in Disney media, girlfriend of Mickey Mouse
 Minnie Bannister, on the British radio series The Goon Show, played by Spike Milligan
 Minnie Crozier, on the New Zealand soap opera Shortland Street
 Minnie Caldwell, on the British soap opera Coronation Street
 Minnie the Minx, a comic strip character from The Beano
 Minnie Bishop, from the anime/manga Strike Witches
 Minnie Fay, in the musical Hello, Dolly! and the film adaptation
 Minnie Goetze, the lead and titular character in the semi-autobiographical graphic novel The Diary of a Teenage Girl and the film adaptation

Other
 Minnie (chimpanzee) (died 1998), the only female chimpanzee in the US Mercury space program, backup to Ham (chimpanzee)
 "Minnie the Moocher", a song first recorded by Cab Calloway in 1931

English feminine given names
Feminine given names
Lists of people by nickname
Hypocorisms